Bihar Hitaishi District Central Library, Patna City, Bihar, India formerly Bihar Hitaishi Pustakalaya is a central government recognized district level library located in Mangal Talab area of Patna City.

History

Computer Literacy Program 
Library had started a computer literacy Program for its members with the help of Bill & Melinda Gates Foundation in 2014. In this program members are educated to gain DCA level knowledge in computers, It is free for library members.

A memento of recognition was awarded by Bill & Melinda Gates Foundation at IPLC 2015 to Librarian Mr. Vivek Kumar Sinha on the behalf of Bihar Hitaishi District Central Library.

Gallery

References 

Libraries in Patna
Buildings and structures in Patna
Government buildings completed in 1883
1883 establishments in India
Libraries established in 1883